The Technological Institute of the Philippines (T.I.P.) is a private research-oriented higher education institution located in Metro Manila, Philippines. It was founded in 1962 by educators Dr. Teresita U. Quirino and Engr. Demetrio A. Quirino, Jr. with the vision to "bring within the reach of the masses the blessings of higher education" in technology and engineering. T.I.P. is known for its outcomes-based TechnoCoRe curriculum which embeds teaching technological entrepreneurship skills to its students. 

The institute has two campuses in Quiapo, Manila and Cubao, Quezon City with over 20,000 graduate, undergraduate, and senior high school students across its eleven (11) colleges. T.I.P. is the only institution in the Philippines that offers Professional Science Master's degree programs in engineering management and data science. As a research institution in technology, T.I.P. is also one of the few institutions in the Philippines that offers the professional doctorate degrees Doctor of Information Technology (DIT) and Doctor of Engineering (DEngr).

T.I.P. was granted autonomous status by the Commission of Higher Education (CHED) since 2009 with 16 Centers of Excellence and Centers of Development in engineering and information technology.

Campuses 

T.I.P.’s first site was the Lorenzana Building in Quiapo, Manila. The school had an initial enrollment of 2,400 which steadily increased throughout the years, prompting the school to slowly but surely expand. In 1967, it set up its main site at G. Puyat Street, Quiapo, Manila.

The institution then directed itself towards specialization in the field of technology. In 1977, it offered a two-year associate course in Marine Engineering. Then in 1980, the Liberal Arts, Education, and High School programs were phased out to make way for the school’s new thrust.

In 1981, additional buildings were leased and the T.I.P. P. Casal, Quiapo location was opened to accommodate the growing student population which had reached over 23,000. T.I.P. Arlegui was opened three years later across P. Casal, both areas being collectively known as the T.I.P. Manila campus. Currently, T.I.P. Manila has four (4) main buildings across the combined 2.3-hectares of the two sites.

The founders opened T.I.P. Quezon City in 1983 along 20th Avenue of Cubao as their answer to the Philippine government’s call for dispersal to decongest the Manila University Belt. Through the years, the Quezon City campus acquired adjacent properties, including a frontage along Aurora Boulevard in the early 2000s. At present, T.I.P. Quezon City has ten (10) main buildings spread out in its 3.3-hectare site.

Accreditations

ABET 
T.I.P. got the first ABET accreditation of 20 of its programs in 2013 – 14 from the Engineering Accreditation Commission (EAC) and 6 from the Computing Accreditation Commission (CAC). 

To future-proof its students and continue with its outcomes-based curriculum, T.I.P. vied for the second cycle of ABET international accreditation in 2018 and received, a year later, reaccreditation of all 20 of its engineering and computing programs.

Seoul Accord 
In 2015, T.I.P.'s Computer Science (BSCS), Information Systems (BSIS), and Information Technology (BSIT) programs were all acknowledged under the Seoul Accord by virtue of their ABET CAC accreditation.

Graduates enjoy full recognition of their degree in countries like the Republic of Korea, Canada, Australia, United Kingdom, United States, China, and Japan.

AUN-QA 
In 2021, T.I.P. gained international recognition from the ASEAN University Network - Quality Assurance (AUN-QA) for the assessment of some of its programs.  The AUN-QA is responsible for educational standards and continuous academic improvement of ASEAN schools.

Local accreditations 
From 2000 to the present, T.I.P. has been voluntarily applying its programs for local accreditations from respected organizations. These accreditations include the Philippine Association of Colleges and Universities Commission on Accreditation (PACUCOA) under the umbrella of the Federation of Accrediting Agencies of the Philippines (FAAP); the Philippine Technological Council; and the Philippine Computer Society (PCS) Information and Computing Accreditation Board (PICAB).

During this period, the Commission on Higher Education (CHED) also awarded 16 Centers of Excellence and Centers of Development to both T.I.P. campuses. Moreover, CHED also awarded Autonomous Status to both T.I.P. Quezon City and T.I.P. Manila in 2016 and again in 2019. Autonomous status is the highest honor CHED can bestow upon a higher education institution..

References

External links 

Universities and colleges in Manila
1962 establishments in the Philippines
Engineering universities and colleges in the Philippines
Education in Quiapo, Manila
Education in Quezon City